Ignacio 'Nacho' López Iglesias (born 24 October 1987) is a Spanish professional footballer who plays for Salamanca. Mainly a right back, he can also play as a midfielder.

Club career
Born in Oviedo, Asturias, López was a Real Oviedo youth graduate. He made his senior debut for the club on 28 May 2006, coming on as a second-half substitute in a 1–1 away draw against Real Unión in the Segunda División B.

After loan stints at CD Lealtad and UP Langreo, López returned to Oviedo. Initially assigned to the reserves, he appeared mainly with the main squad in the Tercera División.

In the 2009 summer López moved to fellow league team Caudal Deportivo. After four full seasons with the side, playing in both third and fourth levels, he signed for Real Avilés.

On 10 July 2014 López joined Oviedo for a third time. He was a regular starter for the side during the campaign, appearing in 32 matches as the Carbayones returned to the Segunda División after a 12-year absence.

On 9 September 2015 López made his professional debut, starting in a 2–1 home win against Real Valladolid, in the season's Copa del Rey.

References

External links

1987 births
Living people
Footballers from Oviedo
Spanish footballers
Association football defenders
Association football midfielders
Segunda División players
Segunda División B players
Tercera División players
Real Oviedo players
CD Lealtad players
UP Langreo footballers
Real Oviedo Vetusta players
Caudal Deportivo footballers
Real Avilés CF footballers
SD Ponferradina players
Pontevedra CF footballers
Salamanca CF UDS players